Tettigometra is a genus of true bugs belonging to the family Tettigometridae.

The species of this genus are found in Eurasia.

Species:
 Tettigometra afra Kirschbaum, 1868 
 Tettigometra angulata Lindberg, 1948

References

Auchenorrhyncha
Hemiptera genera